Softly may refer to:

 Softly (Hank Locklin album) or the title track, 1968
 Softly (Roseanna Vitro album), 1993
 Softly (Shirley Horn album), 1988
 Softly (The Sandpipers album), 1968
Softly (Tatsuro Yamashita album), 2022
 "Softly" (Leah Dizon song), 2007
 "Softly" (Arlo Parks song), 2022
 "Softly", a song by Clairo from the 2019 album Immunity
 "Softly", a song by Gordon Lightfoot from the 1967 album The Way I Feel

See also
 Softly, Softly (disambiguation)